Trofaiach is a municipality in the Leoben district of the state of Styria in Austria, the site of a post World War II British sector displaced persons camp.

Sons and daughters of the town

 Josef Forster (1838-1917), composer, he wrote several, at that time successful, but now forgotten operas 
 Hellmuth Stachel (born 1942), grew up in Trofaiach, Austrian mathematician and professor of geometry at the Vienna University of Technology.
 Hannes Arch (1967-2016), aerobatics pilot, first Austrian participant in the Red Bull Air Race Series 
 Monika Maierhofer (born 1967), former ski racer

References

Cities and towns in Leoben District
Displaced persons camps in the aftermath of World War II